A behavior modification facility (or youth residential program) is a residential educational and treatment institution enrolling adolescents who are perceived as displaying antisocial behavior, in an attempt to alter their conduct.

Due to irregular licensing rules across countries and states, as well as ambiguity regarding the labels that facilities use themselves, it is hard to gauge how widespread the facilities are. The facilities are part of what has been called the Troubled Teen Industry. Programs in the United States have been controversial due to widespread allegations of abuse and trauma imposed on the adolescents who are enrolled, as well as deceptive marketing practices aimed at parents. Critics say the facilities do not use evidence-based treatments.

Methodologies used in such programs
Practices and service quality in such program vary greatly. The behavior modification methodologies used vary, but a combination of positive and negative reinforcement is typically used. Often these methods are delivered in a contingency management format such as a point system or level system. Such methodology has been found to be highly effective in the treatment of disruptive disorders (see meta-analysis of Chen & Ma (2007).

Positive reinforcement mechanisms include points, rewards and signs of status, while punishment procedures may include time-outs, point deductions, reversal of status, prolonged stays at a facility, physical restraint, or even corporal punishment. Research showed that time out length was not a factor and suggestions were made to limit time out to five minute durations.  A newer approach uses graduated sanctions. Staff appear easily trained in behavioral intervention, such training is maintained and does lead to improved consumer outcomes, as well as reduce turn over. More restrictive punishment procedures in general are less appealing to staff and administrators.

Behavioral programs were found to lessen the need for medication.  Several studies have found that gains made in residential treatment programs are maintained from 1–5 years post discharge. Therapeutic boarding schools are boarding schools based on the therapeutic community model that offers an educational program together with specialized structure and supervision for students with emotional and behavioral problems, substance abuse problems, or learning difficulties. Some schools are accredited as Residential treatment centers. 

Behavioral residential treatment became so popular in the 1970s and 1980s that a journal was formed called Behavioral Residential Treatment, which later changed its name to Behavioral Interventions. The journal continues to be published today.

History
In the late 1960s, behavior modification or practice referred to as applied behavior analysis began to move rapidly into residential treatment facilities. The goal was to redesign the behavioral architecture around delinquent teens to lessen chances of recidivism and improve academics. Harold Cohen and James Filipczak (1971) published a book hailing the successes of such programs in doubling learning rates and reducing recidivism. This book even contained an introduction from the leading behaviorist at the time, B.F. Skinner hailing the achievements. Independent analysis of multiple sites with thousands of adolescents found behavior modification to be more effective than treatment as usual, a therapeutic milieu, and as effective as more psychologically intense programs such as transactional analysis with better outcomes on behavioral measures; however, these authors found that behavior modification was more prone to leading to poor relationships with the clients. Over time, interest faded in Cohen's CASE project. Other studies found that in proper supervision of staff in behavior modification facilities could lead to greater use of punishment procedures.

Under the leadership of Montrose Wolf, Achievement place, the first Teaching Family Home became the prototype for behavioral programs. Achievement place opened in 1967. Each home has from 6-8 boys in it with two "parents" trained in behavior modification principles. The token system for the program was divided into 3 levels.  Outcome studies have found that Achievement place and other teaching family homes reduce recidivism and increase pro-social behavior, as well as self-esteem. While initial research suggested the effects of the program only lasted for one year post discharge, recent review of the data suggests the program lasts longer in effect.

Gradually,  behavior modification /applied behavior analysis within the penal system including residential facilities for delinquent youth lost popularity in the 1970s-1980s due to a large number of abuses (see Cautilli & Weinberg (2007) ), but recent trends in the increase in U.S. crime and recent focus on reduction of recidivism have given such programs a second look . Indeed, because of societal needs the number of youth residential facilities has grown over recent years to close to 39,950 in 2000. The use of functional analysis has been shown to be teachable to staff and able to reduce use of punishment procedures. Rutherford's (2009) review from interviews and archival materials documents the decline from  treatment of  behavior analysis with criminal justice populations.

These facilities are part of what has been described as the Troubled Teen Industry.

Some model programs

Studies of successful graduates have shown that boot camp programs as an alternative to prison time are particularly successful in reducing criminality, but these studies are limited to successful graduates of state correctional and prison-alternative programs managed by current and former military service members. Programs such as teaching family homes based on the Teaching-Family Model have been researched by industry funded organizations and show positive gains. Research shows that they can be used to reduce delinquency while adolescents are in the home and post release {see Kingsley (2006). In general, these types of programs take a behavioral engineering approach to reducing problem behavior and building skills.

In general, behavior modification programs, including military style boot camps that follow modern curriculum, that are used in facilities or in the natural environment have a large effect size and lead to an estimated 15 to 40% reduction in recidivism. While this reduction appears to be modest, it holds potential in the U.S. given the large number of people in the prison system. Increasingly, behavior modification models based on the principles of applied behavior analysis, cognitive behavioral therapy, and dialectic behavioral therapy are being developed to model and reduce delinquency and are being integrated into programs of all types.

Controversy
This industry is not without controversy, however.  The U.S. Surgeon General (1999) discussed the need to clarify admission criteria to residential treatment programs. Included in the same report was the call for more updated research as most of the residential research had been completed in the 1960s and 1970s..   Disability rights organizations, such as the Bazelon Center for Mental Health Law, oppose placement in such programs and call into question the appropriateness and efficacy of such group placements, the failure of such programs to address problems in the child's home and community environment, the limited or no mental health services offered and substandard educational programs.

Bazelon promotes community-based services on the basis that it considers more effective and less costly than residential placement. While the behavior modification programs can be delivered as easily in residential programs as in community-based programs  overall community-based programs continue to lack empirical support especially with respect to long term outcomes for severe cases  with the notable exception of Hinckley and Ellis (1985). Even with this said, in 1999 the surgeon general clearly stated "...it is premature to endorse the effectiveness of residential treatment for adolescents.".

From late 2007 through 2008, a broad coalition of grass roots efforts, prominent medical and psychological organizations that including members of Alliance for the Safe, Therapeutic and Appropriate use of Residential Treatment (ASTART) and the Community Alliance for the Ethical Treatment of Youth (CAFETY), provided testimony and support that led to the creation of the Stop Child Abuse in Residential Programs for Teens Act of 2008 by the United States Congress Committee on Education and Labor.

Jon Martin-Crawford and Kathryn Whitehead of CAFETY testified at a hearing of the United States Congress Committee on Education and Labor on April 24, 2008, where they described abusive practices they had experienced at  the Family Foundation School and Mission Mountain School, both therapeutic boarding schools.

One recent acknowledgement has been that long term care does not equate with better outcomes.
To reduce the tendency for abuse, a strong push has occurred to certify or license behavior modifiers or to have such practices limited to licensed psychologists. In particular psychologists with behavioral training  American psychological association offers a diplomat (post Ph.D. and licensed certification) in behavioral psychology.

Often the practice of behavior modification in facilities comes into question (see recent interest in Judge Rotenberg Educational Center, Aspen Education Group and the World Wide Association of Specialty Programs and Schools). Often these types of restrictive issues are discussed as part of ethical and legal standards (see Professional practice of behavior analysis). Recent research has identified some best practices for use in such facilities In general policies in such facilities require the presence of a treatment team to ensure that abuses do not occur especially if facilities are attempting to use punishment programs.

Regulations
In the U.S. residential treatment programs are all monitored at the state level and many are JACHO accredited. States vary in requirements to open such centers. Due to the absence of regulation of these programs by the federal government and because many are not subject to state licensing or monitoring, the Federal Trade Commission has issued a guide for parents considering such placement. Due to irregular licensing practices and differences in the kinds of labels that facilities use themselves, it is unclear how many facilities exist in the United States.

Organizations
Residential therapist who are behavior modifiers should join professional organizations and be professionally affiliated. Many organizations exist for behavior therapists around the world. The World Association for Behavior Analysis offers a certification in behavior therapy  In the United States, the American Psychological Association's Division 25 is the division for behavior analysis. The Association for Contextual Behavior Therapy is another professional organization. ACBS is home to many clinicians with specific interest in third generation behavior therapy. The Association for Behavioral and Cognitive Therapies (formerly the Association for the Advancement of Behavior Therapy) is for those with a more cognitive orientation. Internationally, most behavior therapists find a core intellectual home in the International Association for Behavior Analysis (ABA:I) .

See also
Gooning
Therapeutic boarding school
Teaching-Family Model
Residential treatment center

References

External links
Considering a Private Residential Treatment Program for a Troubled Teen? Questions for Parents and Guardians to Ask, U.S. Federal Trade Commission
 US State Dept. page on offshore BMFs
 TeenLiberty.org, a site which cites many complaints against BMFs
"Exploitation in the Name of 'Specialty Schooling' by Allison Pinto, Ph.D., Robert M. Friedman, Ph.D. and Monica Epstein, Ph.D., Louis de la Parte Florida Mental Health Institute, University of South Florida, American Psychological Association: Children, Youth and Families News, Summer 2005, retrieved June 28, 2006
 Bazelon Center for Mental Health Law
 Alliance for the Safe, Therapeutic and Appropriate use of Residential Treatment
Community Alliance for the Ethical Treatment of Youth
National Youth Rights Association forum on BMFs
 The Parent Help Center Child discipline boot camps for troubled youth - Summer Success Behavior Camp, Weekend Success Camp, and Online Empowered Parent Conference.

Behavior modification
Behaviorism
Youth rights